"Find You" is a song by American singer Nick Jonas. It was released on September 14, 2017, through Island and Safehouse Records.

Background
On September 11, 2017, Jonas teased his next track on Twitter. On Instagram, Jonas teased the track with a series of images showing the same desert picture as is on his Twitter account. The release date of September 14 was announced one day later. On September 13, he shared a snippet of the song through Instagram. Speaking about the new track with iHeartRadio, Nick said, "'Find You' is about a lot of things. For me, it's got a lot to do with just the idea of finding love, in general, and the journey we all go on with that. And how sometimes, it can be something you're afraid of and running away from it in that sense, but it is desperately something we all hope for."

Critical reception
Hugh McIntyre from Forbes said that "Find You" felt like it "would be better suited for the lazy, muggy days of summer". He also called the song "[a] cool track" and noted the Robin Schulz inspiration behind it as the record blends "[an] acoustic guitar with an understated electronic beat". McIntyre also praised Jonas' vocals.

Music video
During an intimate performance he confirmed that the song's music video will be released on September 18, 2017. The song's music video was released on September 19, 2017. The video follows Nick as he broods in the sandy desert, stumbles upon a beach rave, and dives head-first into the ocean. The music video was produced by Emil Nava.

Live performance
He performed the song live for the first time alongside "Chains", "Levels", "Close" and "Jealous" during an intimate performance in Los Angeles. On September 19, 2017, he performed the song on The Ellen DeGeneres Show. On October 4, 2017 he performed the song during an episode of Total Request Live. On November 19, 2017, he performed "Find You" on the American Music Awards.

Track listing
Digital download
"Find You" – 3:17

Digital download
"Find You"  – 3:15

Digital download
"Find You"  – 3:15

Digital download
"Find You"  – 3:17

Charts

Release history

References

2017 singles
2017 songs
Island Records singles
Safehouse Records singles
Nick Jonas songs
Songs written by Nick Jonas
Songs written by Simon Wilcox
Songs written by Svante Halldin
Songs written by Jakob Hazell
Song recordings produced by Jack & Coke